Barges is a commune in the Côte-d'Or department in the Bourgogne-Franche-Comté region of eastern France.

The inhabitants of the commune are known as Bargeois or Bargeoises.

Geography
Barges is located some 12 km due south of Dijon. Access to the commune is by the D996 road from Saulon-la-Rue in the north which passes down the eastern side of the commune and continues south-east to Noiron-sous-Gevrey. Access to the village is by the D109 from Épernay-sous-Gevrey in the south which enters the commune in the west and continues north-east through the village and continues east as the D31 to Bretenière. Apart from a significant-sized urban area around the village the commune is entirely farmland.

The Chairon river rises near the village and flows south-east to join the Sans Fond at Beau-Vallon.

History
Barges appears as Berge dit Barge (Berge known as Barge) on the 1750 Cassini Map and as Barge on the 1790 version.

Heraldry

Administration

List of Successive Mayors

Demography
In 2017 the commune had 621 inhabitants.

Sites and monuments
The War Memorial
The Parish Church of the Assumption contains a Group Sculpture: Virgin of Pity (16th century) which is registered as an historical object.

See also
Communes of the Côte-d'Or department

References

Communes of Côte-d'Or